The 1995–96 Nebraska Cornhuskers men's basketball team represented the University of Nebraska, Lincoln during the 1995–96 college basketball season. Led by head coach Danny Nee (10th season), the Cornhuskers competed in the Big Eight Conference and played their home games at the Bob Devaney Sports Center. They finished with a record of 21–14 overall and 4–10 in Big Eight Conference play. After placing 7th in the conference standings, and losing in the quarterfinals of the final Big Eight tournament, Nebraska won the 1996 National Invitation Tournament.

Roster

Schedule and results 

|-
!colspan=12 style=| Regular season

|-
!colspan=12 style=| Big Eight tournament

|-
!colspan=12 style=| National Invitation Tournament

References

Nebraska
Nebraska Cornhuskers men's basketball seasons
Nebraska
National Invitation Tournament championship seasons
Corn
Corn